The eighth season of the legal drama Law & Order aired on NBC from September 24, 1997, to May 20, 1998, and consisted of 24 episodes.

Cast
The cast of season 8 remained unchanged from season 7. Carey Lowell, who played Jamie Ross, left the series at the end of the 8th season respectively but made a special guest appearance as a Defense Attorney in the 10th season episode "Justice" and the 11th season episode "School Daze", as well as going on to play a judge on Law & Order: Trial by Jury. Carolyn McCormick as Dr. Elizabeth Olivet doesn't appear in this season, nor season 11 or 12.

Main cast
 Jerry Orbach as Senior Detective Lennie Briscoe
 Benjamin Bratt as Junior Detective Rey Curtis
 S. Epatha Merkerson as Lieutenant Anita Van Buren
 Sam Waterston as Executive Assistant District Attorney Jack McCoy
 Carey Lowell as Assistant District Attorney Jamie Ross
 Steven Hill as District Attorney Adam Schiff

Recurring cast
 J. K. Simmons as Dr. Emil Skoda

Guest Stars
 Richard Belzer as Detective John Munch

Episodes

References

External links
Episode guide from NBC.com

08
1997 American television seasons
1998 American television seasons